Restoration Ecology is a bimonthly peer-reviewed scientific journal covering research on restoration ecology. It was established in 1993 and is published by Wiley-Blackwell on behalf of the Society for Ecological Restoration. The editor-in-chief is Stephen Murphy (University of Waterloo).

Abstracting and indexing
The journal is abstracted and indexed in:

According to the Journal Citation Reports, the journal has a 2019 impact factor of 2.721.

References

External links

Journal page at society website

Wiley-Blackwell academic journals
Bimonthly journals
Ecology journals
Publications established in 1993
English-language journals